Sohagi Barwa Wildlife Sanctuary is in the Maharajganj district in Uttar Pradesh state of India. It covers 428.2 km², located on the west Bank of the Gandaki River, near the border with Nepal. Sohagi Barwa is one of the tiger habitats of in Uttar Pradesh. SBWS is divided into seven forest ranges, namely; Pakdi, Madhwaliya, Laxmipur, North Chouk, South Chouk, Seopur and Nichlaul ranges with 21 grasslands. The sanctuary is home to diverse flora and fauna, including tigers.

The terrain of the sanctuary is mostly flat, with an average altitude of 100 meters. The climate is temperate and mild throughout the year, winters are also temperate.

Location
The nearest railhead is Siswa Bazar, at a distance of 22 km.

Attractions
Tigers are the main attraction of Sohagi Barwa Wildlife Sanctuary. Other animals leopard, cheetal, bear, Indian Civet, Giant Squirrel, Hare, wild cat, wild boar, Monitor Lizard, Neelgai, and Indian python. There are seven rest houses in the sanctuary.

External links
Sohagi Barwa Sanctuary info
Sohagibarwa Wildlife Sanctuary (Birdlife International)

References

Wildlife sanctuaries in Uttar Pradesh
Maharajganj district
Protected areas with year of establishment missing